Gerald Sufrin is an American urologist. He is a professor in the department of urology at University at Buffalo School of Medicine and Biomedical Sciences. He was the president of the American Association of Genitourinary Surgeons from April 15, 2015 to April 14, 2016. In 2017, he received the Lifetime Achievement Award from the American Urological Association. He is the father of Carolyn Sufrin.

References 

Living people
Year of birth missing (living people)
American urologists
20th-century American physicians
21st-century American physicians
University at Buffalo faculty